Fox & Friends First is a breakfast television show on Fox News. It airs every weekday at  Eastern/ Pacific. The two-hour-long program hosted by Carley Shimkus and Todd Piro serves as a pre-show to the network's flagship morning show Fox & Friends.

The current incarnation of the show debuted on March 5, 2012, with Heather Childers and Ainsley Earhardt as the original hosts of the show.

Hosts 
Current
 Carley Shimkus, co-host (2021–present) (on maternity leave since February 2023)
 Todd Piro, co-host (2020–present)
 Ashley Strohmier, substitute co-host (2023–present)
 Janice Dean, meteorologist (2012–present)
 Brooke Singman, politics reporter (2021–present)

Former
 Ainsley Earhardt: co-host (2012–2016), left to co-host Fox & Friends (replaced by Rob Schmitt)
 Heather Childers: co-host (2012–2020), was pulled from the air in March 2020 (after being sick on air during the COVID-19 pandemic)
 Rob Schmitt: co-host (2016–2020), was absent from the show before announcing he no longer worked for the network (replaced by Todd Piro)
 Jillian Mele: co-host (2017–2021), left to pursue a degree in October 2021 (replaced by Carley Shimkus)

Synopsis 
The show devotes to new developments of the latest overnight headlines and/or continuous coverage of breaking news. Due to the nature and time of the show, guests rarely appear, so it focuses more on updates of news stories with correspondents, analysis from the hosts, and politics.

When Fox and Friends First launched in March 2012, the show's executive producer, Lauren Petterson, described the show to Fox News Insider this way: "Think of Fox and Friends First like Fox and Friends on steroids. It will include all of the things you love about Fox and Friends – at warp speed. A cheat sheet, if you will, to all the day's big stories…"

Recurring segments/elements 
 "Fox and Trends" – Ashley Strohmier shows the top three trending stories of the day
 "Weather" – Janice Dean presents the weather across the United States
 "Fox Business Headlines" – Cheryl Casone presents top stories that affect the markets
 "The Good, The Bad & The Ugly" – hosts report three headlines in the morning and rate them into a category

Programming announcements and changes 
The new hour was branded Fox & Friends First and was co-anchored by Alisyn Camerota. In July 2008, the  hour was replaced by a third hour of Fox & Friends, and Camerota was named permanent anchor of the weekend edition of Fox & Friends.

In June 2011, rival cable news channel CNN began programming in the  hour, with a one-hour extension of American Morning titled Wake Up Call, which was replaced in January 2012 following American Mornings cancellation by the two-hour Early Start. MSNBC already had started its news programming at that hour with two half-hour shows: Morning Joe First Look, a general news program which had aired since the mid-2000s, and Way Too Early with Jonathan Lemire (which leads into Morning Joe), which debuted in July 2009. The new one-hour show was named Fox & Friends First and serves as a lead-in to Fox & Friends. It debuted on March 5, 2012.

In its first week on the air, Fox & Friends First averaged more total viewers than other programs at CNN and MSNBC in the same time slot combined.

The  hour would be anchored solely by Heather Childers, and Jillian Mele and Rob Schmitt would present the  hour. In July 2020, Childers had parted ways with Fox News after executives had expressed concern and anger about her coming to work and appearing visibly ill on air several months earlier during the wake of the COVID-19 pandemic. In 2021, Jillian Mele was replaced by Carley Shimkus as a co-anchor.

Location 
Fox & Friends First is broadcast from Studio J at 1211 Avenue of the Americas (also known as the News Corp. Building), New York City. On March 19, 2018, Fox & Friends First has relocated to Studio D from its original location in Studio J for construction. The team moved back to Studio J on June 19, 2018.

References

External links
 Fox & Friends First

2012 American television series debuts
2000s American television news shows
2010s American television news shows
2020s American television news shows
English-language television shows
Fox News original programming